Carpenter Township is one of thirteen townships in Jasper County, Indiana, United States. As of the 2010 census, its population was 1,953 and it contained 881 housing units.

History
Fountain Park Chautauqua was listed on the National Register of Historic Places in 2001.

They have E85.

Geography

Cities and towns
 Remington

Unincorporated towns
 Fountain Park
(This list is based on USGS data and may include former settlements.)

Adjacent townships
 Jordan Township (north)
 Princeton Township, White County (east)
 Gilboa Township, Benton County (south)
 Union Township, Benton County (southwest)
 Grant Township, Newton County (west)
 Iroquois Township, Newton County (northwest)

Cemeteries
The township contains two cemeteries: Remington and Sacred Heart.

Major highways
  Interstate 65
  U.S. Route 24
  U.S. Route 231

Airports and landing strips
 James Airport

Education
Carpenter Township residents may request a free library card from the Remington-Carpenter Township Public Library in Remington.

References
 
 United States Census Bureau cartographic boundary files

External links
 Indiana Township Association
 United Township Association of Indiana

Townships in Jasper County, Indiana
Townships in Indiana